Murghab (and various similar transliterations; Russian Мургаб) may refer to:
Marghab District, a district in Ghor province. Murghab River rises from the Marghab district and ends in Turkmenistan.
Bala Murghab District, a district in Badghis Province, northwestern Afghanistan
Murghab, Tajikistan, a town and district capital in Gorno-Badakhshan Autonomous Region, eastern Tajikistan
Murghob District, a district in Gorno-Badakhshan Autonomous Region, eastern Tajikistan
Murgap, Turkmenistan, a town in and district capital in Mary Province, Turkmenistan
Murgap District, a district in Mary Province, Turkmenistan
Bartang River, a river that rises in the Wakhan District of northeastern Afghanistan and flows into Tajikistan, which is known as "Murghab River" in its upper reaches